Yuki Matsuzawa (松澤 ゆき born 1960 in Tokyo) is a Japanese pianist.

Matsuzawa is a pupil of Akiko Iguchi and Hiroshi Tamura at the Tokyo University of the Arts. She subsequently studied with Vladimir Ashkenazy.

Ms Matsuzawa's recording of the Chopin's Études was the basis for one of the many plagiarised recordings issued under the name of Joyce Hatto. This plagiarised recording was hailed by the critic Ates Orga as …an extraordinary feat, poetically strong and frequently electrifying. Even (huskily) vocal. Here we have an artist at full throttle, high on adrenalin, technique gleaming, commanding a Rolls-Royce of an instrument firing on all cylinders.. Reviewing the original recordings for the magazine Gramophone, Harriet Smith summed them up as a very impressive achievement. The critic 'LS', reviewing her debut recording of Scriabin in Gramophone, summed her up as the most exciting newcomer this year to the record catalogue.

Sources
 International Who's Who in Classical Music (9781857431742)

References

1960 births
Japanese classical pianists
Japanese women pianists
Living people
Musicians from Tokyo
Women classical pianists
21st-century classical pianists
21st-century Japanese women musicians
21st-century women pianists